So Sau Wah (born 26 August 1985) is a Hong Kong rower. He competed at the 2004 Summer Olympics, 2008 Summer Olympics and the 2012 Summer Olympics.

References

External links
 

1985 births
Living people
Hong Kong male rowers
Olympic rowers of Hong Kong
Rowers at the 2004 Summer Olympics
Rowers at the 2008 Summer Olympics
Rowers at the 2012 Summer Olympics
Asian Games medalists in rowing
Rowers at the 2006 Asian Games
Rowers at the 2010 Asian Games
Asian Games silver medalists for Hong Kong
Medalists at the 2010 Asian Games
21st-century Hong Kong people